Bhakta Prahlada is a 1958 Indian black-and-white Kannada-language mythological drama film directed by H. S. Krishnaswamy and M. V. Subbaiah Naidu, starring Subbiaha Naidu, Udaykumar, K. S. Ashwath, Lokesh, Leelavathi, and Lakshmi Bhai. This was the debut movie of actor Lokesh as a child artist.

References

1958 films
Indian black-and-white films
Indian drama films
1950s Kannada-language films
Films about Prahlada